Myrcia sessilis is a species of plant in the family Myrtaceae. It is endemic to northern Peru.

References

Endemic flora of Peru
sessilis
Taxonomy articles created by Polbot